Menteşeler, Köşk is a village in the District of Köşk, Aydın Province, Turkey. As of 2010 it had a population of 269 people.

References

Villages in Köşk District